The Ladies in the Green Hats (French: Ces dames aux chapeaux verts) is a 1929 French silent comedy film directed by André Berthomieu and starring Gabrielle Fontan, René Lefèvre and Alice Tissot. It is based on the novel of the same name by Germaine Acremant.

Cast
 Gabrielle Fontan as Rosalie  
 René Lefèvre as Ulysse Hiacinther  
 Alice Tissot as Marie 
 Jean Dehelly as Jean de Fleurville  
 Thérèse Kolb as Ernestine  
 Simone Mareuil as Arlette  
 Georges Deneubourg 
 Jean Diéner 
 Raymond Narlay 
 Hubert Daix
 Gina Barbieri as Telcide  
 Dolly Fiorella 
 Alexandre Heraut 
 Paul Versa

References

Bibliography 
 Goble, Alan. The Complete Index to Literary Sources in Film. Walter de Gruyter, 1999.

External links 
 

1929 films
French silent feature films
French comedy films
1929 comedy films
1920s French-language films
Films directed by André Berthomieu
Films based on French novels
French black-and-white films
Silent comedy films
1920s French films